Old Eucha is a census-designated place (CDP) in Delaware County, Oklahoma, United States. The population was 52 at the 2010 census.

Geography
Old Eucha is located in west-central Delaware County, south of Lake Eucha. It is bordered to the southwest by Kenwood and to the southeast by Tagg Flats.

Demographics

As of the census of 2000, there were 46 people, 14 households, and 14 families residing in the CDP. The population density was 15.0 people per square mile (5.8/km2). There were 14 housing units at an average density of 4.6/sq mi (1.8/km2). The racial makeup of the CDP was 23.91% White, no African American, 71.74% Native American, no Asian, no Pacific Islander, 2.17% from other races, and 2.17% from two or more races. Hispanic or Latino of any race were 4.35% of the population.

There were 14 households, out of which 57.1% had children under the age of 18 living with them, 64.3% were married couples living together, 28.6% had a female householder with no husband present. The average household size was 3.29 and the average family size was 3.21.

In the CDP, the population was spread out, with 34.8% under the age of 18, 8.7% from 18 to 24, 23.9% from 25 to 44, 21.7% from 45 to 64, and 10.9% who were 65 years of age or older. The median age was 30 years. For every 100 females, there were 91.7 males. For every 100 females age 18 and over, there were 76.5 males.

The median income for a household in the CDP was $24,063, and the median income for a family was $23,125. Males had a median income of $16,250 versus $18,333 for females. The per capita income for the CDP was $6,206. There were 9.5% of families and 12.4% of the population living below the poverty line, including 20.0% of under eighteens and none of those over 64.

References

Census-designated places in Oklahoma
Census-designated places in Delaware County, Oklahoma